Matthew Ryan Angle (born September 10, 1985) is an American baseball coach and former professional baseball outfielder. He is an assistant baseball coach at Ohio State University. He played college baseball at Ohio State University from 2005 to 2007 for coach Bob Todd before playing professionally from 2007 to 2015, playing for the Baltimore Orioles in 2011.

Amateur career
Prior to playing professionally, Angle attended Whitehall-Yearling High School in Whitehall, Ohio and then Ohio State University. In his first year with Ohio State, 2005, he hit .307 with 13 stolen bases. The following year, he hit .369 with 25 stolen bases, and in 2007 - his final year with the team - he hit .366 with 22 stolen bases. After the 2006 season, he played collegiate summer baseball with the Cotuit Kettleers of the Cape Cod Baseball League.

Professional career

Baltimore Orioles
Angle was drafted by the Baltimore Orioles in the seventh round of the 2007 Major League Baseball Draft, beginning his professional career that season.

He played for the Aberdeen IronBirds in 2007, hitting .301 with 34 stolen bases in 61 games. In 2008, he hit .287 with 37 stolen bases for the Delmarva Shorebirds. The next season, he played for the Frederick Keys (123 games) and Bowie Baysox (eight games), hitting a combined .292 with 42 stolen bases. With the BaySox and Norfolk Tides in 2010, Angle hit .278 with 29 stolen bases.

He made his major league debut on July 17, 2011. He played in 31 games in 2011, with a .177 batting average.

Los Angeles Dodgers
The Los Angeles Dodgers claimed him off waivers from the Orioles on February 23, 2012. He spent the entire 2012 season with the AAA Albuquerque Isotopes, appearing in 115 games and hit .303. On October 11, the Dodgers outrighted Angle to the Isotopes, removing him from the 40-man roster. In 2013, he played in 120 games and hit .283 for the Isotopes, while hitting 8 homers, driving in 62 RBI and stealing 22 bases.

Miami Marlins
Angle signed a minor league deal with the Miami Marlins on December 3, 2013. He played in 88 games for the Marlins AAA affiliate.

Oakland Athletics
Angle signed a minor league deal with the Oakland Athletics in 2015. He was released by the A's on July 18, 2015.

Coaching career
In 2018, Angle was named an assistant baseball coach at Ohio State University.

References

External links

Living people
1985 births
Baseball players from Columbus, Ohio
Baltimore Orioles players
Aberdeen IronBirds players
Delmarva Shorebirds players
Bowie Baysox players
Frederick Keys players
Norfolk Tides players
Albuquerque Isotopes players
Ohio State Buckeyes baseball coaches
Ohio State Buckeyes baseball players
Cotuit Kettleers players
New Orleans Zephyrs players
Tomateros de Culiacán players
American expatriate baseball players in Mexico
Nashville Sounds players
Midland RockHounds players